Ákos Barcsay (Achatius) (1619 ? - Kozmatelke July 1661) , was Prince of Transylvania from September 1658 to August 1659 and June to December 1660.

Biography 
Barcsay was born in a respected noble family from Hunyad County.
He grew up at the court of Gabriel Bethlen. The first significant station in his career was an embassy to the Sublime Porte in 1642 in the service of George I Rákóczy. In 1648 he was chief governor of the Hunyad county. Prince George II Rákóczy appointed him princely councilor in 1657 and governor for the time of his campaign to Poland.

The Turks deposed Rákóczy after his unfortunate an unauthorised campaign and had Ferenc Rhédey elected prince on 2 November 1657. However, Rákóczy returned in January 1658 and forced the Diet to recognize him on 25 January 1658. As a reaction the Turks invaded Transylvania, leaving a trail of destruction through the country. Grand Vizier Köprülü Mehmed Pasha appointed Barcsay as prince on 14 September 1658, and the Diet had to agree to the payment of a high tribute and recognition of Barcsay's principality (11 October). 

Rákóczy invaded Transylvania again, and Barcsay fled to the Pasha of Timisoara (August 1659). When Rákóczy was killed in battle in June 1660, Barcsay was reinstated , but a new pretender to the throne appeared in the person of János Kemény. He relied on the Székelys who were radically against Barcsay's collaboration with the Turks and hoped for the help of the Viennese court. He invaded Transylvania in November 1660. Although Barcsay had voluntarily abdicated on 11 December 1660, the new prince had him imprisoned in Görgény and his brother Andreas hanged. He finally accused Barcsay of having contacted the Turks from prison and had him murdered in July 1661.

Sources 
IOS
Deutsche Biographie
Sapere

Monarchs of Transylvania
1661 deaths
17th-century Hungarian people